Lieutenant General Richard P. Mills is a retired United States Marine Corps officer, who served as commander of the Marine Forces Reserve from 2013 to 2015 and Marine Forces North, headquartered at the Marine Corps Support Facility New Orleans. Previously he was deputy commandant for combat development and integration and commanding general, Marine Corps Combat Development Command in Quantico, Virginia, and, prior to that assignment, was commander of the I Marine Expeditionary Force (Forward)/Regional Command Southwest in Afghanistan.

Biography
A native of Huntington, New York, Mills graduated from Franklin and Marshall College with a BA in political science and a minor in history and was commissioned in 1975 as a second lieutenant via Officer Candidate School.

He reported to 1st Battalion, 5th Marines, 1st Marine Division at Camp Pendleton where he served until 1978.

Following that he was assigned for a year to the 3rd Marine Division on Okinawa, Japan.

From 1979 to 1982 he was part of the 2nd Recruit Training Battalion at Parris Island, South Carolina. Upon his promotion to captain he assumed command of Company D, Recruit Training Regiment.

Captain Mills studied at the Amphibious Warfare School in Quantico, Virginia, then moved to the 6th Marines, 2nd Marine Division at Camp Lejeune, North Carolina.

He was promoted to major in 1986 and assigned to Marine Corps Headquarters in Washington, DC, from 1986 to 1989. He later attended the Marine Corps Command and Staff College, then spent a year as a Military Observer with the United Nations in Palestine.

He was promoted to lieutenant colonel and served as the operations officer of the 26th Marine Expeditionary Unit (Special Operations Capable) from 1993 to 1995. Following that he was assigned to the staff of the commander of the United States Sixth Fleet in Gaeta, Italy.  He returned to the 2nd Marine Division in 1997 when he assumed command of 3rd Battalion, 6th Marines.

Lieutenant Colonel Mills studied at the UK Royal College of Defence Studies in London in 1999. before returning to II Marine Expeditionary Force.

He was selected to command the 24th Marine Expeditionary Unit (Special Operations Capable) in 2000 and promoted to colonel. Under his command the 24th MEU (SOC) deployed in Operation Joint Guardian in Kosovo, Operation Enduring Freedom in Afghanistan, and combat operations during Operation Iraqi Freedom as part of Task Force Tarawa.

In June 2003 Colonel Mills reported to Headquarters, United States European Command in Stuttgart, Germany, as the assistant chief of staff.  Upon his promotion to brigadier general in May 2004 he became the deputy director of operations at EUCOM. In 2006 he was assigned to the Headquarters of the Marine Corps as director, Manpower Management Division.

In May 2007 Brigadier General Mills became commander of the 1st Marine Division and spent most of the next two years in Iraq.

He was promoted to major general in late 2007 and from October 2007 to January 2009 served in a dual role as assistant division commander, 1st Marine Division and commander, Ground Combat Element, Multi-national Forces – West in Al Anbar Province, Iraq. Upon his return from Iraq, Major General Mills continued as assistant division commander until July 2009, when he resumed command of the 1st Marine Division.

In December 2009 Major General Mills was selected to command the I Marine Expeditionary Force (Forward), deployed to Afghanistan in April 2010, and assumed command of all Marine combat units in the country. As part of a restructuring of the NATO-led mission in Afghanistan, Regional Command South (commanded by British Major General Nick Carter) was split into two commands. Carter remained in charge of Kandahar and Mills became the commander of the newly formed Regional Command Southwest and took under command 8,000 of the 9,500 British troops in Afghanistan, as well as 20,000 U.S. Marines in Helmand Province.

In Afghanistan, He made clear that his objective involved more than just victory on the battlefield.  On the importance of training Afghan forces to succeed, he has been quoted as saying "We will be here with them as we develop the Afghan security forces to eventually take over our role, so we can leave," On the importance of not leaving Afghanistan until the country is ready, he has also been reported as saying the Afghans "have been very, very concerned we may leave them prematurely."

After his return from Afghanistan, Mills was promoted to the rank of lieutenant general in July 2011 and replaced Lieutenant General George Flynn as deputy commandant for combat development and integration and commanding general, Marine Corps Combat Development Command in Quantico, Virginia.

In August 2013, LtGen Mills assumed command of Marine Forces Reserve and Marine Forces North, and served in this capacity until his retirement on October 1, 2015, after 40 years of active service. He currently serves as president and chief executive officer of the Marine Corps University Foundation.

Lieutenant General Mills has a reputation for having a good sense of humor and being open to subordinates, officers have told reporters. Junior officers are "not afraid to approach him".

Lt.Gen Mills is an avid fan of the New York Giants football team.

Awards and decorations

Notes

References
This article incorporates text in the public domain from the United States Marine Corps.

External links

 Lieutenant General Richard P. Mills Deputy Commandant for Combat Development and Integration at USMC Manpower & Reserve Affairs website
 US Marine Commander Major-General Richard Mills tough but approachable at The Sunday Times Online (UK)
 British Troops in Afghanistan to get U.S. Commander at Thomson Reuters Foundation Alertnet
 Flag ceremony marks new command and control structure in southern Afghanistan
 Afghan Effort Fruitful but Fragile, Commander Says at Signon San Diego News
 Mills takes over helm of MCCDC

1950 births
Living people
United States Marine Corps personnel of the Iraq War
United States Marine Corps personnel of the War in Afghanistan (2001–2021)
People from Huntington, New York
United States Marine Corps generals
Recipients of the Defense Superior Service Medal
Recipients of the Legion of Merit
Franklin & Marshall College alumni